Macairog Sabiniano Alberto is a Filipino general and served as the former Commanding General of the Philippine Army. He is a graduate of the Philippine Military Academy "Sinagtala" Class of 1986.

Alberto's previous commands include the Intelligence Service of the Armed Forces of the Philippines (ISAFP), as well as the 2nd and 3rd Scout Ranger Battalions.

On March 2, 2020, President Rodrigo Duterte appointed Alberto as the new Ambassador to Israel.

Education
Alberto is a graduate of the Philippine Military Academy "Sinagtala" Class of 1986; other training programs he has completed include the Scout Ranger Course, Command and General Staff Course (Second highest in his class), Strategic Intel Course, Counterterrorism Fellowship Program in the US, and Public Management Major in Development and Security at the Development Academy of the Philippines (DAP). Alberto also holds a Master of Arts in Strategic Studies from the National Defense University in Fort Lesley J. McNair, Washington, D.C.

Military career
Lieutenant General Alberto's career started when he served as a Platoon Leader, then a Company Commander at the 2nd Infantry Division (Philippines). Afterwards, Alberto also became a member of the Special Forces as he joined the 1st Scout Ranger Regiment and became a Battalion Commander of two Scout Ranger Battalions; namely the 2nd and 3rd Scout Ranger Battalions, as a lieutenant colonel.

Throughout his career, Alberto was assigned from infantry, intelligence, staff, and special forces positions, and was well-respected among his peers and subordinates. Alberto also served as an Intelligence Officer for the Philippine Contingent in East Timor from 1999-2000. Alberto also headed the Department of Ground Warfare at the Philippine Military Academy, and served as Commandant of the Scout Ranger Training School.

Alberto became the 9th Commander of Task Force Davao in June 2014 and became the Brigade Commander of the 1001 Infantry Brigade of the 10th Infantry Division. Alberto was later appointed as the Chief of the Intelligence Service, Armed Forces of the Philippines (ISAFP), in August 2017. As the commander of the ISAFP, he launched intelligence operations against the New People's Army communist groups,  and the Maute group-Abu Sayyaf terrorist groups. Alberto also led intelligence operations throughout the Battle of Marawi against the terrorist's commanders Omar Maute, Abdullah Maute, and Isnilon Hapilon.

Alberto was appointed as the Commanding General of the Philippine Army on October 15, 2018, where he earned his third star and was promoted to lieutenant general. As the Army's commanding general, he continued initiating reforms by his predecessors, and crafted new doctrines and strategies in engaging both internal and external defense operations, as part of the lessons made during the Marawi Siege. Alberto also oversaw the army's upgraded aviation arm, the Army Aviation Regiment, and also supervised the army's newly created new units as part of the army's modernization programs, such as the 11th Infantry Division, the 1st Brigade Combat Team, and new artillery battery units, namely the 1st Multiple Launch Rocket System Battery, the 2nd Multiple Launch Rocket System Battery, 1st Land-based Missile System Battery, 1st Field Artillery (155mm Self Propelled) Battery, and the 2nd Field Artillery (155mm Self Propelled) Battery, which gave the army time to train, adapt and create measures in preparation of the acquisition of the army's new assets. Alberto retired from military service on December 6, 2019 and was replaced by then-unified command commander of the AFP Southern Luzon Command, Lieutenant General Gilbert I. Gapay.

Awards
  Philippine Republic Presidential Unit Citation
  Martial Law Unit Citation
  People Power I Unit Citation
  People Power II Unit Citation
  Philippine Legion of Honor
  Distinguished Service Star
  Gold Cross Medals
Silver Cross Medals
Distinguished Service Medal
Gawad sa Kapayapaan
  Bronze Cross Medals
  Military Merit 
  Military Civic Action Medal 
  Military Commendation Medal
  Silver Wing Medal
  United Nations Service Medal
  Long Service Medal
  Anti-dissidence Campaign Medal 
  Luzon Anti-Dissidence Campaign Medal
  Visayas Anti-Dissidence Campaign Medal
  Mindanao Anti-Dissidence Campaign Medal
  Disaster Relief and Rehabilitation Operations Ribbon
  Kapanalig ng Sandatahang Lakas ng Pilipinas
  Combat Commander's Badge (Philippines)
  Scout Ranger Qualification Badge
  Honorary Airborne Wings - From The Royal Thai Army
  Legion of Merit

Personal life
Alberto is married to Jessica O. Alberto; they have four children, which is composed of two sons and two daughters.

References

1963 births
Living people
Philippine Army generals
Philippine Military Academy alumni
People from Quezon City